Thujsa (Aymara for smelling, Hispanicized spelling Tucsa) is a mountain in the Wansu mountain range in the Andes of Peru, about  high. It is situated in the Arequipa Region, La Unión Province, Puyca District, southeast of the lake named Ikmaqucha and northeast of Llimphiq.

References 

Mountains of Arequipa Region